The Chinese People's Association for Friendship with Foreign Countries (CPAFFC,  or  in short) is one of the major foreign affairs organizations of the People's Republic of China. The organization is officially termed as a "people's organization" and manages China's sister city relationships. Its stated aim is to promote friendship and mutual understanding between the Chinese people and foreign nations but observers have pointed out that it functions as a front organization in the united front system used to influence and co-opt elites to promote the interests of the Chinese Communist Party (CCP) while downplaying its association with the CCP.

The CPAFFC has been described as the "public face" of the CCP's United Front Work Department. The CPAFFC sponsors and coordinates various front organizations in other countries at the national and sub-national level.

History 
The CPAFFC was founded in May 1954 to promote civic exchanges with countries that did not have diplomatic relations with the PRC. Its leadership is drawn from the upper ranks of the Chinese Communist Party and, as part of the United Front Work Department, it has as its goal "to make the foreign serve China". Its current chairperson is Lin Songtian, China's former ambassador to South Africa who suggested that the U.S. Army was responsible for the COVID-19 pandemic in mainland China.

The CPAFFC has served to cultivate "people to people exchanges" and has attempted to influence sub-national and local levels of government via groups such as the National Governors Association in the U.S. The CPAFFC has sponsored and coordinated with groups such as China Bridge in Germany, the EU-China Friendship Group, Association Sino-Française d'Entraide et d'Amitié (ASFEA) in France, the Italy-China Friendship Association, US–China Peoples Friendship Association, and Neil Bush's George H. W. Bush Foundation for U.S.-China Relations, among others. Since 2016, the CPAFFC has convened the China-U.S. Sub-National Legislatures Cooperation Forum jointly with the non-profit State Legislative Leaders Foundation.

The China Friendship Foundation for Peace and Development (CFFPD) operates under the auspices of the CPAFFC and has forged partnerships with prominent non-profit and private sector entities. In April 2015, the CFFPD signed an education partnership with United Technologies (now Raytheon Technologies). The CFFPD maintains a strategic partnership with the Asia Society in the U.S.

In May 2019, the CPAFFC inked an agreement with Irish think thank Asia Matters, founded and chaired by former politician Alan Dukes.

Responses 
In October 2020, the United States Department of State discontinued participation in the U.S.-China Governors Forum to Promote Sub-National Cooperation, established jointly with the National Governors Association in 2011, due to alleged actions by the CPAFFC to "malignly influence state and local leaders" in the U.S. However, CPAFFC's China-U.S. Sub-National Legislatures Cooperation Forum remained unaffected by the U.S. Department of State's action.

In 2022, the U.S. National Counterintelligence and Security Center issued a warning notice to state and local leaders citing the CPAFFC and the United Front Work Department.

Key people 

 Honorary Chair

 Soong Ching-ling (1980.6－1981.5))
 Deng Yingchao (1982.4－1992.7)

 
 Chair

 Chu Tunan (1954.5－1969.5), Vice-chairman of the 6th NPC Standing Committee
 Wang Guoquan (1972.5－1973.4), pioneer of the Sino-Japanese relations, former Vice President of the China-Japan Friendship Association
 Chai Zemin (1974.6－1975.8), the first Chinese Ambassador to the United States
 Wang Bingnan (1975.8－1986.1), former Vice Minister of Foreign Affairs
 Zhang Wenjin (1986.1－1989.10), former Vice Minister of Foreign Affairs
 Han Xu (1989.10－1994.5), former Vice Minister of Foreign Affairs
 Qi Huaiyuan (1994.5－2000.10), former Vice Minister of Foreign Affairs
 Chen Haosu (2000.10－2011.9), former Vice Minister of Culture; his father is the late Marshal and Foreign Minister Chen Yi
 Li Xiaolin (2011.9－2020.4), whose father is the late Chinese President Li Xiannian
 Lin Songtian (2020.4－present), former Chinese Ambassador to South Africa

 Committee

The 1st CPAFFC Committee included Guo Moruo, Zhao Puchu, Ma Yinchu, Mao Dun, Cao Yu, Lao She, Xia Yan, Tian Han, Ding Xilin, He Luting, Ma Sicong, Mei Lanfang, Huang Xianfan, Jiao Juyin, Yang Hansheng, Zhou Yang, Hu Yuzhi, Fan Changjiang, Zhu Kezhen, Qian Duansheng, Qian Weichang, Hua Luogeng, etc.

See also

Foreign relations of the People's Republic of China
Chinese information operations and information warfare
Chinese intelligence activity abroad
One-China policy

References

External links
 

People's Republic of China friendship associations
Organizations associated with the Chinese Communist Party
Chinese intelligence agencies
Chinese propaganda organisations
Information operations units and formations
Disinformation operations
United front (China)